(fl. 1190s) was a Japanese Buddhist monk who started the first Zen school in Japan.

Biography
While a monk with the Tendai school, he came across texts about Zen which had been brought from China. In 1189, he dispatched two of his disciples to China to meet with Zhuóān Déguāng (拙庵德光, 1121–1203), himself a student of the Rinzai master Dahui Zonggao. The disciples presented a letter Nonin had written describing his realization from practicing Zen on his own. Deguang apparently approved and sent a letter certifying Nonin’s enlightenment. Nonin then started his own school, which he called the Darumashū, or "Bodhidharma school".

Daruma-school
The Daruma-school depended on two sources for their teachings: early Chán as "transmitted on Hiei-zan within the Tendai tradition", with clear elements of teachings from the Northern School, and the Chinese Rinzai-school. The Chán-teaching of 'inherent awakening', or hongaku, influenced the Tendai-teachings. It explains

Because of his nonstandard Dharma transmission and extensive blending of various teachings, his school was heavily criticized. Heinrich Dumoulin wrote of Nonin: 

In opposition to this supposed diversity of teachings, Hee-Jin Kim states:

The Bodhidharma School apparently drew a number of followers, but in 1194 the Tendai establishment requested that the government  have it shut down. They accepted the proposal for the school "being 'incomprehensible' and circulating nonsense." His students continued the school for a brief time, but eventually they dispersed to study with Dōgen or Eisai. In fact, Koun Ejō and Tettsū Gikai, both prominent students of Dōgen to whom nearly all modern Soto Zen teachers trace their lineages, were originally students of Nonin's successors. The transfer of Dogen to Echizen in 1243 may in part have been due "to the fact that the Daruma-shu had a strong following in that province".

There may have been members of the Daruma-school until the Ōnin War 1467–1477, which destroyed much of Zen monasticism.

See also
 Mushi dokugo

References

Sources

Further reading

External links
 The Soka Gakkai Dictionary of Buddhism, Nōnin［能忍］

Zen Buddhist monks
Japanese Buddhist clergy
Founders of Buddhist sects
Heian period Buddhist clergy